The Bacchus Motorcycle Club (BMC) is an Outlaw motorcycle club in Canada. Founded during 1972 in Albert County, New Brunswick. Bacchus MC has since increased its influence, opening fifteen chapters in five Canadian provinces. It is currently the largest Canadian established 1% motorcycle club.

History

Founded in Albert County, New Brunswick, in late August 1972, the Bacchus Motorcycle Club is one of the oldest one-percenter motorcycle clubs in Canada. The name "Bacchus" is derived from the Roman counterpart of Dionysus, the Greek god of wine, women and song. The name of the club originates from the cult and city religions symbolism of Dionysus, who was regarded as the protector or guardian of those who do not belong to conventional society.

On 8 November 2014, Bacchus MC merged with its closest ally, the Original Red Devils Motorcycle Club, to create the first Ontario expansion of the club absorbing the Red Devils three Ontario chapters in Hamilton, Chatham-Kent and Sudbury. Bacchus switched the bottom rocker on their jackets from "Ontario" to "Canada," likely to avoid conflict with the Hells Angels who claim the exclusive right to have a province written on their backs. The club manages close relationships with other well-established Canadian motorcycle clubs like Para-dice Riders MC, Vagabonds MC, Highlanders MC, and the Charlottetown Harley Club.

Insignia
The Bacchus Motorcycle Club wears a three-piece patch on their vest with the club's name on the top, the club logo in the centre and the province they represent on the bottom. The Bacchus club colors, black and gold, are reflected in their club motto: "Black and Gold will never fold". As of 2014, all Bacchus MC and Original Red Devils Motorcycle Club members also sport a brotherhood patch depicting the lasting 1% bond between the two clubs.

Membership and organization
Members of the Bacchus MC must own a Harley-Davidson motorcycle. The club's membership is estimated at two hundred, with fourteen chapters located in five provinces, making it as of 2022 the fifth largest motorcycle club in Canada. With the Hells Angels (44) in first followed by the Outlaws (21), Rock Machine (18) is third and the Loners (16) fourth.

Chapter list

Chapters (15 total in Canada)
New Brunswick
Albert County (Mother chapter)
York County
St. John
Charlotte County
Newfoundland
Grand Falls Windsor
C.B.S (Conception Bay South)
Nova Scotia
Halifax
Colchester
Hants County (Frozen)
Route 333 (Frozen)
Ontario
Hamilton
Chatham
Woodstock
Halton Hill
Muskoka
Prince Edward Island
Kings County
Prince County
Bacchus support clubs
Mountain Men Rednecks MC

Criminal allegations and incidents

Bacchus member Derreck Dean Huggan was charged with possession of drugs and a restricted weapon after police seized approximately $85,000 worth of crack cocaine, marijuana and hashish, as well as $1,600 in cash and a loaded handgun during a raid on a home in Lunenburg County, Nova Scotia on 14 April 2000.

Police again began surveillance on Huggan after a shop he owned and managed was raided in Charlottetown in May 2006. He was arrested in November 2006 as part of a police operation that involved arrests in Charlottetown and Halifax, Nova Scotia. He was convicted on several counts of conspiracy to traffic cocaine, hashish, ecstasy and hydromorphone, and was sentenced to six-and-a-half years in prison in July 2007.

Bacchus member James Russell "Rustie" Hall and his wife Giovanna "Ellen" Hall were murdered in their Barr Settlement, Nova Scotia home on 26 February 2010. The Royal Canadian Mounted Police (RCMP) stated that the deaths may be linked to organized crime.

Matthew Thomas Foley, president of Bacchus' Saint John, New Brunswick chapter, was convicted of manslaughter over the death of Michael Thomas Schimpf, who was shot and killed near the club's headquarters on 14 July 2012. Foley was sentenced to ten years in prison and banned from owning firearms for life in August 2012.

Bacchus members Patrick Michael James, Duayne Jamie Howe and David John Pearce were convicted of extortion and intimidation in July 2018, charged stemming from incidents in 2012 when a man attempted to start a chapter of a non-criminal motorcycle club in Nova Scotia. When Bacchus sergeant-at-arms James discovered the victim's plans to start the chapter, club members threatened him until he ceased the endeavor and he and his wife sold their motorcycles. In November 2018, James was sentenced to three years' imprisonment, Howe to two years' and Pearce to eighteen months'. The case also led a Nova Scotia judge to designate the Bacchus Motorcycle Club a criminal organization under the Criminal Code, the first time the designation had been used in the province.

In March 2013, Bacchus member David James Bishop was charged with a number of crimes, including trafficking cocaine and steroids, relating to a drug smuggling ring at Central Nova Scotia Correctional Facility. He pleaded guilty in April 2013 and was sentenced to two-and-a-half years in prison.

Bishop was one of four men charged in connection with the beating of a man who was left with permanent brain damage. Police allege the victim was assaulted inside a former motorcycle gang clubhouse in New Glasgow, Nova Scotia before he was driven on to Cape Breton Island and abandoned along the side of Highway 105 at Glendale, Nova Scotia on 6 or 7 June 2016. The club is designated a criminal organization under the Criminal Code.

See also
 List of outlaw motorcycle clubs
 Gangs in Canada

References

External links
 Bacchus MC Ontario

Organizations established in 1972
1972 establishments in New Brunswick
Organizations based in New Brunswick
Albert County, New Brunswick
Outlaw motorcycle clubs
Motorcycle clubs in Canada
Gangs in New Brunswick
Gangs in Nova Scotia
Gangs in Ontario